James Grafton Rogers (January 13, 1883 - April 23, 1971) was the Assistant Secretary of State for the United States.

Biography
Rogers was born on January 13, 1883, in Denver, Colorado, to Edmund James Armstrong Rogers (1852-1922) and Maria Georgina Dare.

Rogers was a professor of law and dean of the University of Colorado School of Law from 1928-1931, and 1933-35.

He was the western vice president of the American Alpine Club from 1932 to 1934, and  president of the American Alpine Club from 1938 to 1940.

Rogers died of a stroke on April 23, 1971, in Denver, Colorado.

References

1883 births
1971 deaths
United States Assistant Secretaries of State
University of Colorado Boulder faculty
Deans of law schools in the United States
Lawyers from Denver
Colorado politicians
University of Colorado Law School faculty
20th-century American lawyers
20th-century American academics